Lustra was the third album from English alternative rock band Echobelly. The album was delayed due to label difficulties, line-up changes and the health problems of singer Sonya Madan. The album only reached number 47 in the UK Albums Chart.

Track listing

All songs written by Sonya Madan and Glenn Johansson.
 "Bulldog Baby" – 4:32
 "I'm Not a Saint" – 3:45
 "Here Comes the Big Rush" – 4:25
 "Iris Art" – 3:44
 "The World Is Flat" – 4:01
 "Everyone Knows Better" – 3:42
 "Wired On" – 3:23
 "O" – 4:12
 "Bleed" – 2:40
 "Paradise" – 2:34
 "Angel B" – 5:26
 "Lustra" – 3:54

US bonus tracks
 "Heroes in June" – 2:41
 "Mouth Almighty" –3:59
 "Drive Myself Distracted" – 4:22
 "Falling Flame" – 4:04
 "Holding the Wire" – 3:34

Singles
"The World Is Flat" was released as the first single, and reached 31 in the UK Singles Chart.
"Here Comes The Big Rush" was released as the second single, and reached 56 in the UK Singles Chart.
The two singles, as well as "Iris Art" were included on the 2001 compilation "I Can't Imagine the World Without Me".
"Bulldog Baby" and "The World Is Flat" were featured on the 2008 compilation "The Best of Echobelly"

Personnel 
Echobelly
 Sonya Madan - vocals
 Glenn Johansson and Debbie Smith - guitar
 James Harris - bass
 Andy Henderson - drums
Technical
 Gil Norton - producer
 Roy Spong and Niven Garland - engineers
 Gil Norton and Roy Spong - mixer

References

External links

Lustra at YouTube (streamed copy where licensed)

1997 albums
Echobelly albums
Albums produced by Gil Norton